Athinkhaya, Athinhkaya, or Thinkhaya was a Burmese ministerial and later, royal title of the Burmese monarchy. It may refer to:

Athinkhaya
 Athinkhaya: Co-Regent of Myinsaing (r. 1297–1310)
 Athinkhaya Saw Yun: King of Sagaing (r. 1315–1327)
 Athinkhaya of Tagaung: Viceroy of Tagaung (r. 1340s–1351)

Thinkhaya
 Thinkhaya of Pagan: Governor of Pagan (r.  1380s–1410s)
 Thinkhaya I of Toungoo: Viceroy of Toungoo (r. 1411/12–1415)
 Thinkhaya II of Toungoo: Viceroy of Toungoo (r. 1415–1418/19)
 Thinkhaya III of Toungoo: Governor of Toungoo (r. 1420–1426); Self-proclaimed king of Toungoo (r. 1426–1435)

Burmese royal titles